Ina Fichman is a Canadian film producer and president of Intuitive Pictures, based in Montreal. She is best known for the 2022 film Fire of Love. 

She won the Gemini Award for Best History Documentary Program for Undying Love in 2003. She has been nominated for the 34th Producers Guild of America Awards, British Academy Film Awards, Emmy, Critics Choice Awards and Canadian Screen Awards. Fichman was the recipient of the Hot Docs Don Haig Award in 2018.

She is on the DOC Canada board of directors chair, a board member of the International Documentary Association and a member of The Academy of Motion Picture Arts and Sciences. 

In 2023, she was nominated for an Oscar at the 95th Academy Awards for Best Documentary Feature for Fire of Love.

Filmography
The Last Trip - 1994
Undying Love - 2002
S&M: Short and Male - 2008
Malls R Us - 2009
Mabul (The Flood) - 2010
Inheritance - 2012
Boredom - 2012Shekinah Rising - 2013100% T-Shirt - 2014Monsoon - 2014The Wanted 18 - 2014Vita Activa: The Spirit of Hannah Arendt - 2015Judging Japan - 2016The Oslo Diaries - 2018Gift - 2018Laila at the Bridge - 2018Inside Lehman Brothers - 2018Don't Worry, the Doors Will Open - 2019Stray - 2020Once Upon a Sea - 2021The Gig Is Up - 2021Fanny: The Right to Rock - 2021Blue Box - 2021Gabor - 2021Fire of Love'' - 2022

Awards and nominations

References

External links
 
Intuitive Pictures Official web site

Canadian documentary film producers
Canadian women film producers
Living people
Year of birth missing (living people)
Jewish Canadian filmmakers
Canadian Screen Award winners